Saint-Pierre-lès-Elbeuf (literally Saint-Pierre near Elbeuf) is a commune in the Seine-Maritime department in the Normandy region in northern France.

Geography
The old quarries have some interesting geological strata examples.

Population

Main sights
 The church of St.Pierre, dating from the 19th century.
 The church of St.Louis, also dating from the 19th century.
 The 18th-century château du Parc.

Twin towns
 Rieti, Italy

See also
Communes of the Seine-Maritime department

References

External links

Website about Saint-Pierre-lès-Elbeuf 

Communes of Seine-Maritime